Karamunsing Complex is a shopping centre located in the city of Kota Kinabalu, Sabah, Malaysia. It is one of the earliest shopping mall in the city, together with Centre Point and Wisma Merdeka. The complex is mainly known for selling IT products and services.

See also
 List of shopping malls in Malaysia

References

External links

Shopping malls in Sabah